Signs is the fourth studio album by American blues rock group Tedeschi Trucks Band. The album was released on February 15, 2019, by Fantasy Records, on the same day that Kofi Burbridge, the band keyboardist, died.

Critical reception

Signs received generally positive reviews from critics. At Metacritic, which assigns a normalized rating out of 100 to reviews from critics, the album received an average score of 79, which indicates "generally favorable reviews", based on 6 reviews.

Track listing

Personnel 
 Tim Lefebvre - bass guitar; double bass (5), acoustic guitar (6), baritone guitar (7)
 J.J. Johnson - drums, percussion
 Tyler Greenwell - drums, percussion
 Kofi Burbridge - keyboards; flute (5)
 Susan Tedeschi - lead vocals; lead and rhythm guitars (3, 4, 7, 10)
 Derek Trucks - lead and rhythm guitars; drums (4)
 Kebbi Williams - saxophone
 Elizabeth Lea - trombone
 Ephraim Owens - trumpet
 Mark Rivers, Mike Mattison, Alecia Chakour- vocals

Additional musicians
 Marc Quinones - congas, percussion (1, 2, 8)
 Doyle Bramhall II - additional guitar and vocals (2, 5)
 Alexei Romanenko - cello (2, 3, 5, 9)
 Jorge Peña - viola (2, 3, 5, 9)
 Grabriela Peña-Kim, Jonathan Kuo - violin (2, 3, 5, 9)
 Warren Haynes - vocals (4)
 Oliver Wood- acoustic guitar (11)

Charts

References

2019 albums
Tedeschi Trucks Band albums
Fantasy Records albums